The 1986 All-Big Eight Conference football team consists of American football players chosen by various organizations for All-Big Eight Conference teams for the 1986 NCAA Division I-A football season.  The selectors for the 1986 season included the Associated Press (AP) and the United Press International (UPI).

Offensive selections

Quarterbacks
 Jamelle Holieway, Oklahoma (AP-1, UPI-1)

Running backs
 Keith Jones, Nebraska (AP-1, UPI-1)
 Thurman Thomas, Oklahoma State (AP-1, UPI-1)

Tight ends
 Keith Jackson, Oklahoma (AP-1, UPI-1)

Wide receivers
 Hart Lee Dykes, Oklahoma State (AP-1, UPI-1)
 Willie Vaughn, Kansas (AP-1, UPI-1)

Centers
 Eric Coyle, Colorado (AP-1, UPI-1)

Offensive tackles
 Tom Welter, Nebraska (AP-1, UPI-1)
 John Clay, Missouri (AP-1, UPI-1)

Offensive guards
 Anthony Phillips, Oklahoma (AP-1, UPI-1)
 Mark Hutson, Oklahoma (AP-1, UPI-1)

Defensive selections

Defensive ends
 Broderick Thomas, Nebraska (AP-1, UPI-1)
 Darrell Reed, Oklahoma (AP-1, UPI-1)

Middle guard
 Danny Noonan, Nebraska (AP-1, UPI-1)

Defensive tackles
 Curt Koch, Colorado (AP-1, UPI-1)
 Chris Spachman, Nebraska (AP-1)
 Steve Bryan, Oklahoma (UPI-1)

Linebackers
 Brian Bosworth, Oklahoma (AP-1, UPI-1)
 Barry Remington, Colorado (AP-1, UPI-1)
 Marc Munford, Nebraska (AP-1)

Defensive backs
 Mark Moore, Oklahoma State (AP-1, UPI-1)
 Mickey Pruitt, Colorado (AP-1, UPI-1)
 David Vickers, Oklahoma (AP-1, UPI-1)
 Ricky Dixon, Oklahoma (UPI-1)

Special teams

Place-kicker
 Tim Lashar, Oklahoma (AP-1, UPI-1)

Punter
 Barry Helton, Colorado (AP-1, UPI-1)

Key

AP = Associated Press

UPI = United Press International

See also
 1986 College Football All-America Team

References

All-Big Seven Conference football team
All-Big Eight Conference football teams